Ian Elijah Lawrence Escoe (born 28 May 2002), is a Costa Rican professional footballer who plays as a full-back for Alajuelense in the Costa Rican top division Liga FPD.

Career
Lawrence joined Liga Deportiva Alajuelense in 2019. He made his debut for the club on 10 June, 2020 against A.D.R. Jicaral. He joined lower league side Escazú FC for the remainder of the 2020 season. He rejoined Alajuelense for the 2021 season. He scored his first goal in October 2021 in a 1-0 victory against Santos de Guapiles. He signed a new contract until 2024 at the end of that year.

International career
Lawrence received his first call up for the senior Costa Rica national football team for matches against the Canadian, El Salvadorian, and American teams. He made his debut on 27 March, 2022 as a substitute for Bryan Oviedo against El Salvador. He then made his first start a few days later against the USA.

References

External links

2002 births
Living people
Costa Rican footballers
Association football defenders